Béla Dankó (born 13 May 1969) is a Hungarian politician, member of the National Assembly (MP) for Szarvas (Békés County Constituency V) from 2010 to 2014, and for Békés (Békés County Constituency II) since 2014. He became MP after a by-election, replacing László Domokos, who was appointed  President of the State Audit Office. Dankó was a member of the Committee on Local Government and Regional Development, the Committee on Sustainable Development, then the Agriculture Committee.

He also served as the Mayor of Kondoros between 1999 and 2014.

Personal life
He is married. His wife is Ildikó Dankóné Kovács. They have a daughter, Dóra and two sons, Csanád Béla and Máté Botond.

References

1969 births
Living people
Fidesz politicians
Members of the National Assembly of Hungary (2010–2014)
Members of the National Assembly of Hungary (2014–2018)
Members of the National Assembly of Hungary (2018–2022)
Members of the National Assembly of Hungary (2022–2026)
Mayors of places in Hungary